Saudi Food and Drug Authority (SFDA) (Arabic: needed) is an independent body for the Kingdom of Saudi Arabia that aims to ensure food and drug safety for the nation.

The Authority was founded on Islamic calendar date 07/01/1424 (Gregorian date August 29, 2003). The Saudi Ministry of Health has given it responsibility for the regulation of pharmaceuticals, and it is an influential organization among states within the region.

Work in English-language publications
In 2016, members of the Authority and others published a study that compared the Authority with the best practices of comparable ones in Australia, Singapore, and Canada.

International Agreements 
The Food and Drug Administration has an agreement with the SFDA.

References

External links
 

Medical and health organisations based in Saudi Arabia